James R. Weldishofer (born 1929) is a former member of the Ohio House of Representatives.

Members of the Ohio House of Representatives
1929 births
Living people